Sydney Smith is a Canadian illustrator of children's books. He was awarded the 2015 Governor General’s Award For Illustrated Children’s Books for Sidewalk Flowers, a wordless picture book which he illustrated with author JonArno Lawson. He currently resides in Halifax, Nova Scotia.

Education
Smith studied drawing and printmaking at NSCAD University in Halifax, Nova Scotia. It was while studying there that he realized his interest for illustrating children's books.

Career
Smith has worked for two different publishing houses in his career as an illustrator: Nimbus Publishing and Groundwood Books. In addition to his work as an illustrator for children's books, Smith has also done graphic design work for Canadian musical acts Hey Rosetta! and Old Man Luedecke.

Published works
2010: Mabel Murple by Sheree Fitch
2011: There Were Monkeys In My Kitchen by Sheree Fitch
2012: Toes In My Nose: And Other Poems by Sheree Fitch
2014: Jewel of the Thames (A Portia Adams Adventure Book 1) by Angela Misri
2014: Music Is For Everyone by Jill Barber
2015: Grant and Tillie Go Walking by Monica Kulling
2015: Sidewalk Flowers by JonArno Lawson
2016: Look Out for the Fitzgerald-Trouts by Esta Spalding
2016: The White Cat and the Monk: A Retelling of the Poem "Pangur Bán" by Jo Ellen Bogart
2017: Town Is by the Sea by Joanne Schwartz
2019: Small in the City by Sydney Smith
2020: I Talk Like a River by Jordan Scott

Awards and recognition

References

Canadian children's book illustrators
Governor General's Award-winning children's illustrators
NSCAD University alumni
Living people
Year of birth missing (living people)
Kate Greenaway Medal winners